Acacia caesiella, commonly known as tableland wattle, bluebush wattle or blue bush, is a shrub or small tree that is endemic to eastern Australia.

Description
It has smooth grey or brown bark and angled branchlets. Like most Acacias it has phyllodes instead of true leaves. Globular yellow flowerheads appear between July and October in the species' native range.

Taxonomy
The species was first formally described by the botanists Joseph Maiden and William Blakely in 1927 as part of the work Journal and Proceedings of the Royal Society of New South Wales. It was reclassified as Racosperma caesiellum by Leslie Pedley in 2003 then transferred back to genus Acacia in 2006.

Distribution
It is found in the state of New South Wales mostly of the slopes of the Great Dividing Range from around Burrenjuck in the south out Mount Coricudgy in the east and to Baradine in the west. It is found on rocky areas as a part of dry sclerophyll woodland communities.

See also
List of Acacia species

References

caesiella
Flora of New South Wales
Fabales of Australia
Plants described in 1927
Taxa named by Joseph Maiden
Taxa named by William Blakely